A total of 16 teams, 8 from West Asia and 8 from East Asia, competed in the 2011 AFC Champions League knockout stage. They included the 8 group winners and the 8 group runners-up from the group stage.

Each round of this single-elimination tournament was played over one or two matches. In the round of 16, each tie was played in one match, hosted by the winners of each group against the runners-up of another group. In the quarter-finals and semi-finals, each tie was played over two legs on a home-and-away basis. The final was hosted by one of the finalists, decided by draw. The away goals rule (for two-legged ties), extra time (away goals do not apply in extra time) and penalty shootout would be used to decide the winner if necessary.

The matchups for the round of 16 were decided prior to the group stage draw. After the completion of the round of 16, the draw for the quarter-finals, semi-finals, and final was held in Kuala Lumpur, Malaysia on 7 June 2011. In this draw, the "country protection" rule was applied: if there are exactly two clubs from the same country, they may not face each other in the quarter-finals; however, if there are more than two clubs from the same country, they may face each other in the quarter-finals.

Qualified teams

Bracket
While the bracket below shows the entire knockout stage, the draw for the round of 16 matches was determined at the time of the group draw, and kept teams from East and West Asia completely separate for that round.

The draw for the quarter-finals and beyond was held separately, after the conclusion of the round of 16.

Round of 16
The matches were played 24–25 May 2011.

|-
|+West Asia

|}

|+East Asia

|}

Matches

Quarter-finals
The first legs were played 14 September 2011, and the second legs were played 27–28 September 2011.

|}

Notes

First legs

Second legs

Jeonbuk Hyundai Motors won 9–5 on aggregate.

Al-Ittihad won 3–2 on aggregate.

Suwon Samsung Bluewings won 3–2 on aggregate.

Al-Sadd won 4–2 on aggregate.

Semi-finals
The first legs were played 19 October 2011, and the second legs were played 26 October 2011.

|}

First legs

Second legs

Jeonbuk Hyundai Motors won 5–3 on aggregate.

Al-Sadd won 2–1 on aggregate.

Final

The final was played 5 November 2011 at home of one of the finalists, decided by draw. This format is different from the 2009 and 2010 editions, where the final was played at a neutral venue.

References

External links
AFC Champions League Official Page

Knockout stage